The  Nicholson–Bailey model was developed in the 1930s to describe the population dynamics of a coupled host-parasitoid system. It is named after Alexander John Nicholson and Victor Albert Bailey. Host-parasite and prey-predator systems can also be represented with the Nicholson-Bailey model. The model is closely related to the Lotka–Volterra model, which describes the dynamics of antagonistic populations (preys and predators) using differential equations.

The model uses (discrete time) difference equations to describe the population growth of host-parasite populations. The model assumes that parasitoids search for hosts at random, and that both parasitoids and hosts are assumed to be distributed in a non-contiguous ("clumped") fashion in the environment. In its original form, the model does not allow for stable coexistence. Subsequent refinements of the model, notably adding density dependence on several terms, allowed this coexistence  to happen.

Equations

Derivation
The model is defined in discrete time. It is usually expressed as 

with H the population size of the host, P the population size of the parasitoid, k the reproductive rate of the host, a the searching efficiency of the parasitoid, and c the average number of viable eggs that a parasitoid lays on a single host.

This model can be explained based on probability.  is the probability that the host will survive  predators; whereas  is that they will not, bearing in mind the parasitoid eventually will hatch into larva and escape.

Analysis of the Nicholson–Bailey model

When , all non-negative solutions lie on level curves of the function  and converge to a fixed point on the -axis. When , this system admits one unstable positive fixed point, at

Variations

Density dependence can be added to the model, by assuming that the growth rate of the host decreases at high abundances. The equation for the parasitoid is unchanged, and the equation for the host is modified: 

 

The host rate of increase k is replaced by r, which becomes negative when the host population density reaches K.

See also
 Lotka–Volterra inter-specific competition equations
 Population dynamics

Notes
 Parasitoids encompass insects that place their ova inside the eggs or larva of other creatures (generally other insects as well).

References

Further reading

External links
 Nicholson–Bailey model
 Nicholson-Bailey model with density dependence
 Nicholson-Bailey spatial model

Predation
Population models
Mathematical and theoretical biology